The 2008 Triple J Hottest 100 was announced on Australia Day, 26 January 2009. It was the sixteenth countdown of the most popular songs of the year, as chosen by the listeners of Australian radio station, Triple J.

2008 was also the first year of the countdown where Triple J made public the full list of songs that did not make the list proper. Coined as the "Hottest 200", the list was released online shortly after the main countdown.

Voting commenced on Boxing Day, 26 December 2008, and closed on 18 January 2009. The second half of the countdown was broadcast live from Parramatta Park in New South Wales, with live crosses to the Big Day Out, held at Flemington Racecourse in Melbourne, Victoria.

Over 800,000 votes were received, a record number.

Full list
Note: Australian artists

101 was "All Alone" by Jackson Jackson.

Artists with multiple entries
Four tracks
 Kings of Leon (1, 3, 24, 70)
 Vampire Weekend (30, 32, 58, 71)
 Nick Littlemore (Twice with Pnau and Empire of the Sun) (4, 12, 54, 68)

Three tracks
 MGMT (2, 5, 18)
 The Presets (6, 8, 56)
 Flight of the Conchords (19, 60, 67)
 Birds of Tokyo (20, 22, 51)
 The Grates (34, 80, 83)
 Bliss n Eso (40, 61, 94)
 Ladyhawke (Twice solo and once with Pnau) (11, 12, 26)
 Lily Allen (Twice solo and once with the Kaiser Chiefs) (25, 46, 90)

Two tracks
 Empire of the Sun (4, 68)
 The Ting Tings (9, 78)
 Drapht (10, 77)
 Pnau (12, 54)
 Cog (31, 97)
 Dizzie Rascal (17, 96)
 The Herd (13, 63)
 Josh Pyke (27, 29)
 The Killers (52, 73)
 Muph and Plutonic (86, 99)
 Laura Marling (Once solo and once with Mystery Jets) (43, 49)

Countries represented
 Australia – 48
 United States – 29
 United Kingdom – 14
 New Zealand – 5
 Iceland – 2
 France – 1
 Norway – 1

Top 10 Albums of 2008
Bold winner of the Hottest 100. The Presets won the J Award for Apocalypso.

CD release
Triple J's Hottest 100 Volume 16 is the compilation featuring the best of the Top 100 voted tracks on two CDs.  It went on sale on 6 March 2009.

Notes

References

2008 in Australian music
Australia Triple J
2008